The 1970 NHL Amateur Draft was the eighth NHL Entry Draft. It was held on June 11, 1970, the day after the 1970 Expansion Draft, at the Queen Elizabeth Hotel in Montreal, Quebec.

The last active player in the NHL from this draft class was Billy Smith, who retired after the 1988–89 season.

Selections by round
Below are listed the selections in the 1970 NHL amateur draft. Buffalo was given first choice by a spin of a roulette wheel.

Round one

Notes
 The Los Angeles Kings' first-round pick went to the Boston Bruins as the result of a trade on May 20, 1968 that sent Skip Krake to Los Angeles in exchange for this pick.
 The Philadelphia Flyers' first-round pick went to the Boston Bruins as the result of a trade on October 18, 1967 that sent Rosaire Paiement to Philadelphia in exchange for this pick.
 The California Golden Seals' first-round pick went to the Montreal Canadiens as the result of a trade on May 21, 1968 that sent Norm Ferguson, Stan Fuller, future considerations (Francois Lacombe and Michel Jacques) to California in exchange for Wally Boyer, Alain Caron, future considerations (Lyle Bradley), California's first-round pick in 1968 (Jim Pritchard) and this pick.
 The Minnesota North Stars' first-round pick went to the Montreal Canadiens as the result of a trade on June 14, 1967 that sent the rights for Danny O'Shea to Minnesota in exchange for this pick.
 The St. Louis Blues' first-round pick went to the Boston Bruins as the result of a trade on May 26, 1970 that sent Jim Lorentz to St. Louis in exchange for this pick.
 The Montreal Canadiens' first-round pick went to the California Golden Seals as the result of a trade on May 22, 1970 that sent Francois Lacombe, a first-round pick in 1971 and cash to Montreal in exchange for Ernie Hicke and this pick.

Round two

 The Montreal Canadiens' second-round pick went to the Minnesota North Stars as the result of a trade on June 10, 1970 that sent Montreal's second-round pick in 1970 and Bobby Rousseau to Minnesota in exchange for  Claude Larose its second-round pick in 1970.
Montreal previously acquired this pick as the result of a trade on November 17, 1969 that sent Montreal's second-round and third-round pick in 1970 in addition to the rights to Jean Potvin to Los Angeles in exchange for Los Angeles' third-round and fourth-round pick in 1970 along with this pick.
 The Montreal Canadiens' second-round pick went to the Los Angeles Kings as the result of a trade on November 17, 1969 that sent Los Angeles' second-round, third-round pick and fourth-round pick in 1970 to Montreal in exchange for Montreal's third-round pick in 1970, the rights to Jean Potvin and this pick.

Round three

 The Los Angeles Kings' third-round pick went to the Montreal Canadiens as the result of a trade on November 17, 1969 that sent Montreal's second-round and third-round pick in 1970 in addition to the rights to Jean Potvin to Los Angeles in exchange for Los Angeles' second-round and fourth-round pick in 1970 along with this pick.
 # The Montreal Canadiens' third-round pick went to the Los Angeles Kings as the result of a trade on November 17, 1969 that sent Los Angeles' second-round, third-round pick and fourth-round pick in 1970 to Montreal in exchange for Montreal's second-round pick in 1970, the rights to Jean Potvin and this pick.

Round four

 The Los Angeles Kings' fourth-round pick went to the Montreal Canadiens as the result of a trade on November 17, 1969 that sent Montreal's second-round and third-round pick in 1970 in addition to the rights to Jean Potvin to Los Angeles in exchange for Los Angeles' second-round and third-round pick in 1970 along with this pick.

Round five

Round six

Round seven

 The Vancouver Canucks' seventh-round pick went to the St. Louis Blues as the result of a trade on June 10, 1970 that sent Andre Boudrias to Vancouver in exchange for Vancouver's ninth-round pick in 1970, cash and this pick.

Round eight

Round nine

 The Vancouver Canucks' ninth-round pick went to the St. Louis Blues as the result of a trade on June 10, 1970 that sent Andre Boudrias to Vancouver in exchange for Vancouver's seventh-round pick in 1970 (Jack Taggart), cash and this pick.

Round ten

Round eleven

Round twelve

Round thirteen

Draftees based on nationality

See also
 1970–71 NHL season
 1970 NHL Expansion Draft
 List of NHL players

References

External links
 HockeyDraftCentral.com
 1970 NHL Amateur Draft player stats at The Internet Hockey Database

Draft
National Hockey League Entry Draft